The Timm Aircoach, also called the Timm Coach and the Golden Shell Special, was a custom-built, high-capacity, high altitude aircraft for charter flights.

Design and development
The Aircoach was built in a shop at Glendale Airport, where Otto and Wally Timm had a shop. Al Menasco had a shop nearby where he modified engines. The Aircoach used a Menaso modified Salmson engine.

The Aircoach was a single engine, conventional landing gear equipped biplane with an open cockpit for two pilots and enclosed passenger cabin. The fuselage was made of welded steel tubing with plywood covering.

Operational history
Roscoe Turner flew the underpowered Shell Special Golden Shell twice, attempting endurance records. Each flight resulted in damage and the efforts were abandoned.

Specifications (Aircoach)

References

Biplanes
Aircoach